Hon. Richard Thomas Rowley (1812 – 11 November 1887) was a British Conservative Party politician.

Family
Rowley was the son of Clotworthy Rowley, 1st Baron Langford, and Frances Rowley. He married Charlotte Shipley, daughter of William Shipley and Charlotte Williams-Wynn on 24 June 1835. Together, they had three children:
 Eva Rowley (died 1904)
 Gwenwydd Frances Rowley (–1892)
 Conwy Greville Hercules Rowley-Conwy (1841–1900)

After Charlotte died in 1871, Rowley remarried to Alice Henrietta Berners, daughter of Hugh Berners and Julia Alice Ashton, on 9 July 1872.

Political career
He was elected MP for Harwich at a by-election in 1860 but did not seek re-election in 1865.

Other activities
Rowley was at one point Captain in the Scots Guards, a Deputy Lieutenant of Flintshire, and Honorary Lieutenant-Colonel in the 6th Battalion, King's Royal Rifle Corps.

References

External links
 

Deputy Lieutenants of Flintshire
Conservative Party (UK) MPs for English constituencies
UK MPs 1859–1865
1812 births
1887 deaths